Theopompus was a Eurypontid king of Sparta. He is believed to have reigned during the late 8th and early 7th century BC.

Sparta was a diarchy, having two kings at the same time, an Agiad and a Eurypontid. Theopompus was the son and successor to the Eurypontid king Nicander.

The major event of his reign was the First Messenian War, which resulted in the defeat of the Messenians, for which, Pausanias reports, Tyrtaeus credits Theompompus:

 To our king beloved of the gods, Theopompus, through whom we took Messene with wide dancing-grounds.

Pausanias reports that Theopompus was succeeded by his grandson Zeuxidamas or great-grandson Anaxidamus, Theopompus' son Archidamus having predeceased him, though there is some evidence that his successor was Anaxandridas I, father of Zeuxidamus.

Plutarch, in his Parallel Lives, stated that it was in Theopompus' reign that the ephors were introduced in Sparta. Plutarch also recorded a tradition in Messenia that Theopompus had fallen in battle, being slain by Aristomenes. Sparta denied the truth of this latter story, claiming that Theopompus had been only wounded.

References

8th-century BC rulers
8th-century BC Spartans
7th-century BC rulers
7th-century BC Spartans
Eurypontid kings of Sparta
8th-century BC births
7th-century BC deaths
Messenian Wars